The 2016–17 season was AEL Kalloni's first season in the Football League following their relegation from the Super League Greece last season. Along with the Football League, the club also competed in the Greek Cup. The club was expelled from the league on 24 May 2017, due to unpaid debts to its former footballers Kostas Dafkos and Alexandros Chintaseli, and relegated to Gamma Ethniki.

Club

Other information

Pre-season friendlies

Last updated: 17 September 2016Source: AEL Kalloni F.C.

Competitions

Overall

Last updated: 24 May 2017Source: Competitions

1On 24 May 2017, the club was expelled from the league.

Overview

{| class="wikitable" style="text-align: center"
|-
!rowspan=2|Competition
!colspan=8|Record
|-
!
!
!
!
!
!
!
!
|-
| Football League

|-
| Greek Cup

|-
! Total

Football League

League table

Results summary

Results by matchday

Matches
The fixtures were announced on 5 September.

a.Panthrakikos retired from the league.
b.AEL Kalloni were expelled from the league.

Last updated: 24 May 2017Source: Football League

Greek Cup

Second round

Last updated: 15 December 2016Source: HFF

Players

Squad statistics

Appearances and goals

Key

No. = Squad number

Pos. = Playing position

Apps = Appearances

GK = Goalkeeper

DF = Defender

MF = Midfielder

FW = Forward

Numbers in parentheses denote appearances as substitute. Players with number struck through and marked  left the club during the playing season.

Source: AEL Kalloni

Top scorers
 	

Source: Superleague Greece

Suspended players

Source: AEL Kalloni F.C.

Injuries

Players in bold are still out from their injuries.  Players listed will/have miss(ed) at least one competitive game (missing from whole matchday squad).

 'Return date' is date that player returned to matchday squad.Source: Kalloni F.C.

Transfers

Summer

In

Loaned in

Out

Winter

In

Out

References

2016-17
Greek football clubs 2016–17 season